4 Legendary Witches is a 2014 South Korean television series starring Han Ji-hye, Ha Seok-jin, Go Doo-shim, Oh Hyun-kyung and Ha Yeon-soo. It aired on MBC from October 25, 2014, to March 8, 2015, on Saturdays and Sundays at 21:45 (KST) for 40 episodes. It reached a peak viewership rating of 31.4% on its 29th episode.

Synopsis
Orphan Moon Soo-in marries Ma Do-hyun, the eldest son of the chaebol family who owns bakery corporation Shinhwa Group. But when Do-hyun dies unexpectedly, the Ma family makes Soo-in take the fall for their illegal business practices and she ends up in jail for stock manipulation that she didn't commit. At Cheongju's Penitentiary for Women, her cellmates are kind-hearted and consists of Shim Bok-nyeo who was falsely accused of killing her husband and son; tough-as-nails, foul-mouthed Son Poong-geum who was convicted of fraud, and former model Seo Mi-oh who's been charged with the attempted murder of her boyfriend, Shinhwa Group's youngest son.

The four women bond and become friends, particularly when they join the baking classes being taught by Nam Woo-suk, a hotel chef. Woo-suk is a widower who is raising his daughter alone after the death of his wife six years ago. At his father-in-law's suggestion, he became a volunteer at the local prison's vocational training center, where he meets Soo-in and begins to fall for her.

Upon their discharge, the four women put the baking skills they learned in prison to use, opening up a bakery together. But they face stiff competition from the Shinhwa Group.

Cast

Main
Han Ji-hye as Moon Soo-in
Ha Seok-jin as Nam Woo-seok
Go Doo-shim as Shim Bok-nyeo
Oh Hyun-kyung as Son Poong-geum
Ha Yeon-soo as Seo Mi-oh

Supporting

The Ma Family
Park Geun-hyung as Ma Tae-san
Shim Hyung-tak as young Tae-san
Jung Hye-sun as Bok Dan-shim
Jeon In-hwa as Cha Aeng-ran
Ha Eun-jin as young Aeng-Ran
Byun Jung-soo as Ma Joo-ran
Lee Seung-joon as Park Won-jae
Kim Yoon-seo as Ma Joo-hee
Do Sang-woo as Ma Do-jin
Go Joo-won as Ma Do-hyun (cameo)

Seochon Residence Family
Park In-hwan as Park Yi-moon
Lee Jong-won as Tak Wol-han
Lee Sook as Bae Chung-ja
Lee Han-seo as Nam Byeol
Kim Soo-mi as Kim Young-wok

Extended
Hong Ah-reum as Eun Bo-kyung
Lee Seung-hyeong as Director Wang
Kwon Seong-deok as Kim Deok-Gu
Kim Jung-dyoon as Lee Gang-Choon
Yum Dong-hun as Oh Man-Bok
Park Ah-sung as Mr. Kim
Kim Hee-jung as Top Safety CEO

Ratings

Awards and nominations

References

International broadcast
 It aired in Vietnam on HTV2 beginning September 22, 2015, under the title Người vợ dũng cảm.

External links
  
 
 4 Legendary Witches at MBC Global Media

2014 South Korean television series debuts
2015 South Korean television series endings
MBC TV television dramas
South Korean romance television series
Television series by Pan Entertainment
Television shows set in North Chungcheong Province